is a subway station on the Tokyo Metro Tozai Line in Shinjuku, Tokyo, Japan, operated by the Tokyo subway operator Tokyo Metro. It is numbered T-02.

Lines
Ochiai Station is served by the Tokyo Metro Tozai Line.

Station layout
The station consists of an island platform serving two tracks.

Platforms

History
The station opened on 16 March 1966.

The station facilities were inherited by Tokyo Metro after the privatization of the Teito Rapid Transit Authority (TRTA) in 2004.

Passenger statistics
In fiscal 2013, the station was 116th busiest on the Tokyo Metro network with an average of 24,035 passengers daily. The passenger statistics for previous years are as shown below.

See also
 List of railway stations in Japan

References

External links

Ochiai Station information (Tokyo Metro) 

Stations of Tokyo Metro
Tokyo Metro Tozai Line
Railway stations in Tokyo
Railway stations in Japan opened in 1966